Thikariya is a small village in Rajasthan located on NH-52, 10 km from Ringus Sikar, Rajasthan. It has a railway station and located 500meter from Thikariya Village. 
Thikariya village is also head of Panchayat Samiti and Sahakari Samiti under which are the following villages
1. Shahpura
2. Samota-Ka-Bas
3. Ladpur 
4. Malikpur

There are Three petroleum are also available.  
Maheswari Filing 
Nayara Petroleum Pump
One under construction at Malikpur

Population and literacy
Thikariya has a population of 3483, of which 1764 are males and 1719 are females as per the 2011 Census of India. It has an average sex ratio of 974, which is higher than Rajasthan state's average of 928. 

It has a higher literacy rate than average for Rajasthan. In 2011, It had a literacy rate of 72.60% in comparison to 66.11% overall in Rajasthan. The male literacy rate was 88.17% while the female literacy rate was 56.96%.

References

Villages in Sikar district